Harry Roy Gozzard (March 5, 1916 - January 11, 1995) was an American jazz trumpeter. He performed with Sam Donahue. (In an article written by Mike Zirpolo, for Swing and Beyond, Donahue was described as “a superlative tenor saxophone soloist.”) Other members of Donahue’s band included the former The Tonight Show Starring Johnny Carson bandleader Doc Severinsen, 1946 Esquire Award winner for Best New Female Vocalist Frances Wayne, Grammy Award-winning vocalist and actress Jo Stafford and popular music arranger Leo Reisman. Gozzard and the Donahue band performed a few times with legendary piano-playing bandleader Count Basie. Basie was featured on four Donahue Okeh recordings made in New York on December 26, 1940.

In William F. Lee’s book, American Big Bands, he mentioned that Gozzard was a sideman in the Sonny Burke Orchestra in the early 1940s. They performed at the famous Roseland Ballroom in New York. (Lady Gaga was the last one to perform there before it closed its doors in 2014. The online newspaper Curbed mentioned in an article that the site was redeveloped into a 62-story, luxury apartment building.) At the time, Burke’s band  recorded for Decca, Okeh and Vocalion. Gozzard was a part of at least 16 recordings with Burke’s band.

English jazz discographer Brian Rust stated in his book, Jazz and Ragtime Records (1897-1942), that Gozzard was a part of the Jan Savitt Orchestra, in the early 1940s. Four Bluebird recordings were made in Hollywood during his stint with Savitt’s band. Two of the recordings featured the lovely voice of MGM actress and singer Gloria DeHaven. Gozzard joined the Savitt orchestra when Donahue was drafted into the Navy during World War II. When the war ended, Donahue assembled together a cast of top musicians and formed another band. Gozzard and legendary trumpet player Doc Severinsen were two of the members of that band which began in 1946 and ended in 1951. An article in the The Morning Call stated that Severinsen “joined the Sam Donahue Orchestra in 1948 and the Tommy Dorsey Orchestra in 1949.”

Early life
The youngest of Charlotte (née Campbell) and William Gozzard’s four children, Harry Gozzard was born in Shelburne, Ontario, Canada, on March 5, 1916.  His three older siblings, Margaret “Bessie” Gozzard Pulis, William Leonard Gozzard and Kathleen Mary Gozzard Costigan, were also born in Shelburne. Gozzard’s ancestors originated in England, Scotland and Ireland. His grandmother migrated to Canada from Ireland during the Great Famine of the 1840s. He, his parents and the other siblings migrated to Detroit, Michigan in 1924. In 1949, Gozzard met a Kentucky-born woman named Wilda Crager. They married in 1952.

Career
 During his years in Donahue’s band, he took part in a recording known as Beat the Band to the Bar. It is a collection of songs recorded between 1930 - 1954. Allmusic described it as a “sampler of irreverent hot novelties, jazz burlesques, and big-band sendups.” Many prominent jazz musicians performed on that album...Sam Donahue, Tommy Dorsey, Glenn Miller, Guy Lombardo, Woody Herman, Count Basie, Artie Shaw, Rudy Vallée, Hoagy Carmichael, Charlie Barnet, Ozzie Nelson and many more.

At the young age of 25, Gozzard (in Donahue’s band) performed in a series of recordings for Bluebird Records. Founded in 1932 by, Eli Oberstein, Bluebird was a RCA Victor subsidiary label best known for their low-cost releases. They eventually became known as the “Bluebird sound,” which directly influenced rhythm and blues music, as well as early rock and roll music.

Oberstein pioneered the practice of payola, a term used in the music industry to describe the illegal practice of paying commercial radio stations to play songs without the stations disclosing the payments. (Payola can greatly influence a song’s perceived popularity.) Oberstein was suddenly and unexpectedly fired in 1939 by RCA Victor. Since no explanation was ever given regarding his firing, one is left to wonder if the reason might have been directly related to his underhanded dealings with radio stations.

 During his career, Gozzard was mentioned in a few different articles in DownBeat magazine. He appeared in a revealing photo in one of those articles (November 15, 1940) that was rather intriguing. While staring at a newspaper, he had his arm around the lovely vocalist Lynne Sherman, who was also looking at the same paper at the time. In fact, the entire Sonny Burke Orchestra had their eyes affixed to that paper, because it had a list of men who had recently been selected in the draft. (Even though World War II had already begun the previous year, the United States would not officially get involved in it until one year later, on December 8, 1941.) That particular photographic pose doesn’t necessarily reveal that Gozzard and Sherman were in some sort of personal relationship, but it does arouse a certain measure of curiosity to find out whether or not they were, especially since Sherman married another trumpet player the following year, Milton Ebbins. (They were married for 67 years. Ebbins had an illustrious career in show business and was also an insider in the Kennedy administration.) Gozzard, along with Sherman and the other members of Burke’s orchestra, performed together during the recording of the Vocalion record If It Wasn’t For The Moon. An article in The Tampa Tribune mentioned the new record release of If It Wasn’t For The Moon and the flip-side song Easy Does It, stating, “Harry Gozzard’s trumpet reaches way up to here against the harmonious saxophone choir background in the rhythmic Easy Does It and the moon song bounces along nicely with Lynne Sherman performing the lyric, but good.” A photo of Lynne Sherman also appeared in another DownBeat issue, September 15, 1940. The caption reads, “Sony Burke, who reviews his band at left, with chirper Lynne Sherman, a Boston chick. Both are heard, with Burke’s band, on Okeh records. The combo is from Detroit...”

 It was stated in a caption of a photo archived in the Library of Congress that Sam Donahue and his orchestra were booked together with Lionel Hampton and his orchestra at the Aquarium in New York in 1946. The individuals in charge of the event scheduled Donahue and his orchestra to perform in the afternoons. However, the aquarium wasn't open in the afternoon, so, during one of those workless afternoon sessions, Donahue and his orchestra ended up lovingly playing to an audience of one, an adorable kitty named Hep.

A jazz record company and label founded almost 30 years later in Edinburgh, Scotland, is named Hep Records. They began as a reissue label for material from radio transcription discs, mainly big band music from the 1940s. Sam Donahue material was reissued by Hep Records. Sam Donahue And His Orchestra - Hollywood Hop is one of the reissues. Gozzard is listed as one of the instrumentalists for tracks 1–11 on that CD.

Singer and saxophonist Tex Beneke, best known for the popular songs Chattanooga Choo Choo, I’ve Got a Gal in Kalamazoo, Don't Sit Under the Apple Tree and Jukebox Saturday Night, traveled in 1938 to Gozzard’s and Donahue’s hometown of Detroit. There, Donahue heard him and mentioned him to his then-boss Gene Krupa. Not able to hire a new member at the time, Krupa referred Beneke to Glenn Miller who was putting together a new band. Beneke joined Miller's new band.

 It is mentioned in the IMDb bio of Sam Donahue and also in an UPROXX article that Frank Sinatra Jr. was a vocalist for Donahue. According to a DownBeat article, “he began performing in his mid-teens for the Sam Donahue band.” Sinatra later mentioned that the majority of what he learned about singing was learned through the time he spent with Donahue and the other musicians in the band. Incidentally, Sinatra Jr. was kidnapped in Lake Tahoe while on tour with Donahue. His father Frank Sinatra paid the $240,000 ransom which ultimately led to his son’s release from the kidnappers.

The Sam Donahue band had several top-10 hits: Dinah, Put That Kiss Back Where You Found It, My Melancholy Baby, The Whistler, I Never Knew, Just The Other Day, Red Wing and A Rainy Night In Rio. They are a part of the songs that make up The Sam Donahue Collection - 1940-1948. Gozzard is included in the credits of that collection. I’ll Never Tire of You, a 1941 recording that Gozzard played trumpet in, is featured in that collection. Acrobat Records is the label name. Marketing and distribution for the album was handled by Arista Records. An article in Jazz Journal featured that reissue album; which has a majority of Donahue’s songs from the 1940s, many of which, Gozzard performed in. Online music database AllMusic also highlighted that album on their website. Trapeze Music & Entertainment Limited, an independent label and distributor with a loyal customer base in the UK, US and throughout mainland Europe, highlighted a quote in their reviews (borrowed from Jazzviews March 2021) by Derek Ansell, a regular contributor to Jazz Journal, stating, “Although these pieces vary tremendously from track to track the music is all well played and shines a spotlight on a musician who really deserved to be much better known than he was.” In an article in The Syncopated Times, Scott Yanow, who has written for Down Beat, Jazz Times, AllMusic, Cadence, Coda and the Los Angeles Times, stated, regarding the collection of Donahue’s songs, that “it is a pity that it could not have been a three-CD set that included everything” that he recorded during 1940–48. Yanow also voiced his opinion in that article regarding the musical skills of Donahue and his band members, stating that “the musicianship is consistently excellent.” The songs from that album are listed in the Spotify and Apple Music listening databases. Donahue’s band has six songs on radio historian Alex Cosper’s list of “Top Pop Hits of 1947.”

The Norwich University student newspaper compiled rave reviews that were made by music critics from Billboard, The Boston Post, The Hartford Times, Music and Rhythm, Swing and Orchestra World, basically claiming that Sam Donahue’s orchestra “Is America’s Band of 1942.” One of the reviews stated that “‘Sam Donahue’s band plays good jazz the way it should be played—with a fine ensemble feeling for the music. They play in a decided colored groove and unlike most white bands that try to play that way, have succeeded in getting a relaxed approach to the music they play.’“ Gozzard was listed as one of the four trumpet players in the personnel directory of band members.

During the 1960s, Gozzard played in the orchestra on the two steamers (SS Columbia and SS Ste. Claire) that ferried passengers (on Detroit River) to and from Boblo Island Amusement Park.

Gozzard played in the Windsor, Ontario Elmwood Casino orchestra during the 1960s. Well-known celebrities, like Sammy Davis, Jr., Tom Jones, Ann-Margret, Tony Bennett, Bob Newhart, Patti Page, Liza Minnelli and Sonny and Cher, performed at the Elmwood.

On April 15, 2019, Cher made a surprise appearance on The Tonight Show Starring Jimmy Fallon. Her primary reason for doing so was “to promote The Cher Show, a Broadway musical about her life and career,” stated Dan Savoie in a 519magazine article. During the impromptu interview, Jimmy Fallon asked Cher if there were any parts of her career that she disliked. Cher immediately replied with a rousing response, stating, “Yeah, umm, yeah...!” She then proceeded to talk a few moments about the tough time that she and Sonny were going through back in the late 1960s. Cher stated that “Sonny and I were really famous and our career just went off a hill. We had no money and we had no job and we owed the government $278,000. We just got in a car and headed towards Windsor, Ontario and started our life again.” They went to Windsor due to the fact that they were booked for a three-week engagement (September 1969) at the Elmwood Casino. Since they “were broke-ass broke,” Sonny and Cher “stayed in a seedy motel eating in their room.” A defining moment happened during that engagement at the Elmwood that started to turn things around for them. Savoie stated that “they slowly developed an act that would change everything.” The “act” was Cher would wear a gown and Bono would wear a tuxedo. Cher stated that, at first, “the people hated us...I finally got so pissed off I turned around – like sometimes you do – and started to make the band laugh. And the band will laugh at anything.” Soon after their Elmwood engagement, they took the new comedic concept to Vegas. It was a success.

Early in his career, Bob Newhart had a one-week engagement at the Elmwood. He stated in a Mister Kelly's interview in 2017 that he “‘never got a laugh.’” Even though his comedic performances didn’t bring the house down, Newhart still managed to speak well of the Elmwood audiences, stating, “They were very polite...Canadians...very nice.” In David Steinberg’s book, Inside Comedy, Newhart stated that poor performance at the Elmwood “‘almost drove me back to accounting.’” Shortly after the Elmwood engagement, he had another gig in Winnipeg that “went well.” That ray of hope persuaded him to “‘stay in the business.’”

Gozzard was in the band that performed during the Al Kaline Day celebration at Tiger Stadium in Detroit, Michigan, on August 2, 1970. Mel Tormé sang Thanks For The Memory.

During the 1970s, Gozzard performed in the Grand Hotel orchestra situated on Mackinac Island. The romantic fantasy drama film Somewhere in Time was shot on location there in the 1970s as well. Five U.S. presidents have visited the hotel and island.

Gozzard also performed in “Detroit’s Million Dollar Ballroom,” officially known as the Graystone Ballroom. It was one of the six great ballrooms in Detroit. Steven Loza, who has served on the national screening committee of the Grammy Awards for many years, mentioned in his book (The Jazz Pilgrimage of Gerald Wilson) that Wilson told him that the Graystone was “one of the finest ballrooms in the world.” After years of neglect, the Graystone fell into disrepair and was subsequently demolished (1980) in order to make way for a McDonald’s restaurant.

Gozzard was a member of the Detroit Federation of Musicians organization for 50-plus years. He became a member in 1934, at 18 years of age. He was awarded a commemorative pin for his 50th year being affiliated with them. They are a part of the American Federation of Musicians.

Family
 On May 17, 2022, Gozzard was the subject of discussion in the first of a two-part iHeart radio show created by Our American Stories. (The interview was conducted by Montie Montgomery. He, along with Madisyn Darracott and Lee Habeeb worked together in a collaborative effort to produce the project.) The interviewee, George Gozzard, who is the youngest child of Harry Gozzard, divulged personal insights regarding particular points of interest regarding the life of his father. The “absolute coolest memory” George shared about his father was the time when he and his brother Greg travelled 300 miles up north to visit their father on Mackinac Island. The ferry that they were on during their foggy voyage to the island was almost involved in a collision with a very large, unidentified Lake freighter. Many years after that incident occurred, George hypothetically proposed the remote possibility that the freighter involved in that incident “could have been” the legendary SS Edmund Fitzgerald. His only reason to support his conjecture was the fact that the Fitzgerald had not yet sunk in Lake Superior.

Discography

As sideman
With Sam Donahue
 Sam Donahue Collection (48 tracks - Bluebird Records, Capitol Records)
 Hollywood Hop (26 tracks - Hep Records) 
 Beat the Band to the Bar (27 tracks - Sanctuary)
 lt Counts A Lot (Okeh, 1940)
 Lonesome (Okeh, 1940)
 Four Or Five Times (Okeh, 1940)
 Skooter (Okeh, 1940)
 Loafin’ on a lazy day (Victor, 1941)
 Au reet (Victor, 1941)
 They still make love in London (Victor, 1941)
 Saxophone Sam (Victor, 1941)
 Do you care (Victor, 1941)
 Beat the band to the bar (Victor, 1941)
 Pick up the groove (Victor, 1941)
 Six Mile stretch (Victor, 1941)
 Coffee and cakes (Victor, 1941)
 Flo-flo (Victor, 1941)
 Half a heart is worse than none (Victor, 1941)
 I’ll never tire of you (Victor, 1941)
With Sonny Burke
 l May Be Wrong (Vocalion, 1939)
 Lament (Vocalion, 1939)
 The Last Jam Session (Vocalion, 1939)
 Tea For Two (Vocalion, 1939)
 Pick A Rib (Vocalion, 1940)
 I Never Purposely Hurt You (Vocalion, 1940)
 If It Wasn’t For The Moon (Vocalion, 1940)
 Easy Does It (Vocalion, 1940)
 Jimmy Meets The Count (Okeh, 1940)
 Can I Be Sure? (Okeh, 1940)
 Carry Me Back To Old Virginny (Okeh, 1940)
 Blue Sonata (Okeh, 1940)
 The Count Basically (Okeh, 1940)
 More Than You Know (Okeh, 1940)
 Jumpin’ Salty (Okeh, 1940)
 Minor de Luxe (Okeh, 1940)
With Count Basie
 Count Basie - The Alternative Takes (25 tracks - Neatwork)
With Jan Savitt
 lf I Cared A Little Bit Less (Bluebird, 1942)
 Romance a la Mode (Bluebird, 1942)
 Manhattan Serenade (Bluebird, 1942)
 If You Ever, Ever Loved Me (Bluebird, 1942)

References

External links

Sam Donahue and his orchestra - I’ll Never Tire of You
Sam Donahue and his orchestra - It Counts A Lot: Featuring Count Basie
Sam Donahue and his orchestra (with Doc Severinsen) - Saxa Boogie
Sonny Burke and his orchestra - Tea For Two
Harry Gozzard recordings at the Discography of American Historical Recordings.
 Sam Donahue band member kidnapped - “It Was A Very Bad Year” - Robert J. Randisi
My Musician Father, Harry Gozzard
Gozzard in band playing trumpet while Mel Tormé sang Thanks for the Memories on Al Kaline Day August 2, 1970

1916 births
1995 deaths
20th-century American male musicians
20th-century American musicians
20th-century trumpeters
American jazz trumpeters
American male jazz musicians
American male trumpeters
Capitol Records artists
RCA Victor artists
Swing trumpeters
People from Detroit
Canadian male jazz musicians